Alfons Lemmens (April 19, 1919 – January 18, 2013) was a Dutch association football player who played as a defender for the professional football department of sports club Philips Sport Vereniging.

References

1919 births
2013 deaths
Dutch footballers
PSV Eindhoven players
People from Bladel
Association football defenders
Footballers from North Brabant